Somosaguas Centro is a station on Line 2 of the Metro Ligero. It is located in fare Zone B1.

References 

Madrid Metro Ligero stations
Buildings and structures in Pozuelo de Alarcón
Railway stations in Spain opened in 2007